The 2000 Generali Ladies Linz was the 2000 Tier II WTA Tour tournament of the annually-held Generali Ladies Linz women's tennis tournament. It was the 14th edition of the tournament and was held from 17 October until 22 October 2000 at the Design Center in Linz, Austria. First-seeded Lindsay Davenport won the singles title.

Points and prize money

Point distribution

Prize money

* per team

Singles main draw entrants

Seeds 

Rankings are as of 9 October 2000.

Other entrants 
The following players received wildcards into the singles main draw:
  Iva Majoli
  Sylvia Plischke
  Patricia Wartusch

The following players received entry from the qualifying draw:
  Denisa Chládková
  Karina Habšudová
  Amanda Hopmans
  Henrieta Nagyová
The following players received entry as lucky losers:
  Silvia Farina Elia
  Tatiana Panova

Withdrawals

Before the tournament
  Monica Seles → replaced by  Silvia Farina Elia
  Lisa Raymond → replaced by  Tatiana Panova

During the tournament
  Cara Black (Personal issues)

Retirements
  Barbara Schett (Right toe infection)
  Tatiana Panova (Shoulder injury)

Doubles main draw entrants

Seeds 

Rankings are as of 9 October 2000.

Other entrants
The following pair received wildcards into the doubles main draw:
  Daniela Kix /  Jenny Zika

The following pair received entry from the qualifying draw:
  Anne Kremer /  Henrieta Nagyová

The following pair received entry as lucky losers:
  Sybille Bammer /  Maja Palaveršić-Coopersmith

Finals

Singles

  Lindsay Davenport defeated  Venus Williams, 6–4, 3–6, 6–2.
It was Davenport's 29th WTA singles title, and third title of the year.

Doubles

  Amélie Mauresmo /  Chanda Rubin defeated  Ai Sugiyama /  Nathalie Tauziat, 6–4, 6–4.
It was Mauresmo's 1st WTA doubles title. It was Rubin's 10th WTA doubles title, and second of the year. This was their first and only doubles title together as a pair. This was also Rubin's final WTA doubles title.

References

Generali Ladies Linz
Linz Open
Generali Ladies Linz
Generali Ladies Linz
Generali